Prince George's County Public Schools (PGCPS) is a large public school district administered by the government of Prince George's County, Maryland, United States, and is overseen by the Maryland State Department of Education. The school system is headquartered in Upper Marlboro and the district serves all of Prince George's County.The district includes all of the county. The district is headed by Dr. Monica Goldson  and a 14-member Board of Education.

With  students enrolled for the 2017–2018 school year, the Prince George's County Public Schools system is the second largest school district in the state of Maryland; the third largest school district in both the Washington Metropolitan Area and Baltimore-Washington Metropolitan Area, after Fairfax County Public Schools in Virginia and Montgomery County Public Schools in Maryland; and it is one of the top 25 largest school districts in the nation. PGCPS operates 208 schools and special centers which include: 123 elementary schools (PreK-5), 24 middle schools (6-8), 23 high schools (9-12), and 12 academies (PreK-8). The school system also operates 9 special centers, 2 vocational centers, 3 alternative schools, 8 public charter schools, and the Howard B. Owens Science Center, serving students from Pre-Kindergarten through Grade 12.

PGCPS operates the two largest high schools in the state of Maryland — (Dr. Henry A. Wise, Jr. High School and Northwestern High School), respectively. The school system transports over 90,536 students, daily, by its fleet of 1,335 GPS-equipped school buses, on 5,616 bus routes. PGCPS employs approximately 23,785 staff members which includes an estimated 9,197 teachers. The approved operating budget for FY2014-15 is approximately US$1.795 billion with a per pupil expenditure of US$11,753. Average teacher salary ranges from US$55,689 for teachers with a bachelor's degree to US$80,009 for teachers with a doctorate's degree.

In terms of racial demographics, African-Americans make up the majority of the system's students at 55.32%, followed by 36.46% Hispanic, 3.67% Caucasian, 2.76% Asian, and the remaining 1.79% comprising various other races.

In June 2009, the PGCPS became one of the first school systems in America to name one of its schools after former President Barack Obama. Barack Obama Elementary School, in the Westphalia census-designated place, near Upper Marlboro, opened in August 2010.

History

Early schools in Prince George's County

In 1899, the first high school was built in Prince George's County, at the northeast corner of Montgomery and Eighth Streets in Laurel, Maryland, and was named Laurel High School.

In 1902, Frederick Sasscer, Jr. became Superintendent of Schools, a post he held until 1914.

Desegregation

In 1974, Prince George's County, Maryland, became the largest school district in the United States forced to adopt a busing plan. The county was over 80 percent white in population and in the public schools. In some county communities close to Washington, there was a higher concentration of black residents than in more outlying areas. The county had a neighborhood-based system of school boundaries. However, the NAACP argued that housing patterns in the county still reflected  segregation. The federal court ordered that a school busing plan be set in place. A 1974 Gallup poll showed that 75 percent of county residents were against forced busing, and that only 32 percent of blacks supported it.

The transition happened quickly as the court ordered that the plan be administered with "all due haste". This happened during the middle of the school term, and students, except those in their senior year in high school, were transferred to different schools to achieve racial balance. Many typical school activities and life in general for families in the county was disrupted by things such as the changes in daily times, transportation logistics, and extracurricular activities.

The federal case and the school busing order was officially ended in 2001, as segregation had been erased to the court's satisfaction, and neighborhood-based school boundaries were restored.

School consolidation (2009–2010s)
On March 26, 2009, the Prince George's County Public Schools Board of Education voted to consolidate eight under-enrolled schools in the county and expand magnet program offerings within the school system. This decision was made after a series of community briefings, public hearings, more than 2,500 survey responses, and additional public input.

This process of expanding opportunities for students began in June 2008. The Board of Education directed the school district to conduct a comprehensive review of school enrollments
in September 2008. Recognizing that some schools were significantly under-enrolled, the Board of Education sought to offer more educational opportunities in historically under-served areas of the county, relieve overcrowding where possible, and improve operating efficiencies. The Board of Education used constituent feedback to refine the proposal made by Interim Superintendent Dr. William R. Hite, Jr. earlier this year, and reduced the number of schools to be consolidated to eight instead of 12. The plan still relieves overcrowded schools, identifies space for new academic choices, and expands successful programs. The school district’s next step will be to solicit public input on what new or expanded programs communities would like to see in their schools.

In January 2009, the Superintendent presented the Board with the first of four phases in a proposal. Phase I was approved with the following components for the 2009–2010 school year:

No high schools were affected by Phase I.
Eight schools were consolidated and students were reassigned for the 2009–2010 school year. The following schools were closed (permanently) starting with the 2009–2010 school year: Berkshire Elementary, John Carroll Elementary, John E. Howard Elementary, Matthew Henson Elementary, Middleton Valley Elementary, Morningside Elementary, Owens Road Elementary, and G. Gardner Shugart Middle School.
Five schools were converted to Kindergarten through Grade 8 (K-8) programs: Andrew Jackson Middle School, Samuel P. Massie Elementary School, and William W. Hall Elementary School, whom of which enroll students in grades K-8, while Henry G. Ferguson Elementary School and Eugene Burroughs Middle School, were combined to create the Accokeek Academy PreK-8 school with the Talented & Gifted Center (TAG) Magnet Program from Henry Ferguson carrying over to the newly combined school and expanding to include grades 7 and 8.
Benjamin D. Foulois Elementary School was converted to a K-8 Creative & Performing Arts magnet center for the southern end of the county, replicating the current program at Thomas G. Pullen Arts Magnet School.
Concord, Dodge Park, District Heights, and Oakcrest elementary schools were removed from the list of potential schools to be closed/consolidated.
Communities will make recommendations on what new magnet programs they want for their schools (i.e. Foreign Language Immersion, Montessori)

Additional schools consolidated around 2016, as student populations in southern portions of the county and inside the Capital Beltway decreased; schools in northern parts of PG County, on the other hand, became overcrowded, including schools serving Beltsville, Hyattsville, and Laurel.

Superintendent/CEO
As part of the 2013 reorganization of the PGCPS Board of Education and PGCPS governance spearheaded by county executive Rushern Baker, the position of PGCPS superintendent was renamed as "CEO of PGCPS." The reorganization gave a greater degree of control of operation of the school system to the CEO and limited the powers of the school board. Dr. Kevin Maxwell served as the first CEO of PGCPS until his negotiated exit in 2018, at which time Monica Goldson was elevated from deputy superintendent to interim CEO.

List of superintendents:

 Monica Goldson (interim 2018–2019; 2019–present)
 Kevin M. Maxwell (2013–2018)
 Alvin Crawley (interim 2012–2013)
 William R. Hite, Jr. (interim 2008–2009; 2009–2012)   
 John E. Deasy (2006–2008)
 Howard A. Burnett (interim 2005–2006)
 André J. Hornsby (2003–2005)
 Iris T. Metts (1999–2003)
 Jerome Clark (1995–1999)
 Edward M. Felegy (1991–1995)
 John A. Murphy (1984–1991)
 Edward J. Feeney (1976–1984)
 Carl W. Hassel (1970–1976)
 William S. Schmidt (1951–1970)
 G. Gardner Shugart (1944–1951)
 Nicholas Orem Sr. (1921–1943)
 E.S. Burroughs (1915–1921)
 Frederick Sasscer Jr. (1902–1914)

Transportation

Prince George's County Public Schools offers students transportation to and from school with its own bus system. The system runs a fleet of various school bus models by Blue Bird Corporation, IC Bus, and Thomas Built Buses. Models include rear-engined and front-engined types, which all operate on diesel fuel. Special-needs children are provided with an accessible bus. All buses display "Prince George's County Public Schools" on both sides. The transportation department operates from 13 bus lots, which in total operate over 1200 buses on over 5000 routes. Ridership varies annually, although at least 93,000 students ride buses provided by the department. All routes consist of three digit numbers, such as 001, 219 or 615 and a letter-digit route, such as B12 or D14. In addition to transportation to and from schools, the school district runs buses for school field trips, athletic events, and other approved necessities for a bus in Maryland. Ridership of each bus is determined by the distance in which the student lives from their school, which includes but not limited to two miles for intermediate and secondary schools and one and half mile for primary schools. Each route is determined through a trapeze system, in which information regarding students is entered into a computer system and the outcome is their route number.

List of schools

High schools 

All high schools in Prince George's County operate with a "comprehensive" model as their base, with the exception of the new Academy of Health Sciences at Prince George's Community College, which is a middle college program. All students are assigned to a high school based on an attendance area.

Magnet Programs operate as a "School-Within-A-School" model, where the magnet serves as an alternative program---in addition to the main comprehensive program---and students from outside the regular attendance area of the high school are enrolled and accepted into the magnet, either through continuity (automatic continuation from a middle school magnet program to the high school level equivalent) or more commonly, through a Magnet Lottery, in which students apply for a magnet program and are granted acceptance through a random drawing. Enrollment into the Center for the Visual and Performing Arts is through audition only.

Several high schools have also implemented a Smaller Learning Community model, where they offer anywhere from two or more Academy Programs, which effectively breaks a school down into several smaller schools within the school, by allowing students to essentially declare a major (such as a student attending a college or university) through career academies such as "Arts, Media, and Communication" or the "National Academy of Finance," for example.

All high schools within PGCPS operate on a staggered school day schedule, where some high schools start as early as 7:45am and end as early as 2:25pm, and other high schools start as late as 9:30am and end as late as 4:10pm. All high schools operate on an alternating A/B-day block scheduling system, where one group of classes are taken on "A-Days" and a different group of classes are taken on "B-Days," and the cycle repeats. Most high schools have between three and four lunch shifts, depending on enrollment and eating accommodations. The only exceptions are Eleanor Roosevelt High School — which has adopted a modified hybrid block schedule in which both traditional single period courses and double period (block schedule) courses are integrated — and the Academy of Health Science at Prince George's Community College.

{| class="toccolours" border="1" cellpadding="5" style="border-collapse:collapse"
|+ High schools
|- style="background:darkblue;"
!style="width:235px;"|School
!Website
!Location
!style="width:90px;"|Opening date (current facility)
!Grades
!Enrollment (2014–15)
!Square footage
!style="width:80px;"|Attendance hours (start/end)
!Specialized programs
|-  
|  rowspan="2"|Academy of Health Sciences at Prince George's Community College
|  align="center"|Link
|  align="center"|Largo
|  align="center"|2011
|  align="center" |9-12
|  align="right"|397 students
|  align="center"|N/A
|  align="center" |9:30a – 4:40p
|  Current program(s): Academy of Health Sciences
|-  
|  style="background:#fff;" colspan="8"|Notes & comments: This high school is run in conjunction with the Prince George's Community College (PGCC) with classes being held on the PGCC campus, and is the State of Maryland's first middle college. The school admitted the first class of 100 freshmen in the fall of 2011. A new grade level will be added each year until a full, four-year, grades 9-12 high school is operational. There will be a total of 400 students.
|-
|  rowspan="2"|Bladensburg High School
|  align="center"|Link
|  align="center"|Bladensburg
|  align="center"|1936
|  align="center"|9–12
|  align="right"|1,857 students
|  align="right"|304,000
|  align="center"|9:30a – 4:10p
|  Current program(s): Biomedical Magnet Program; Career and Technical Education Magnet Program; Academy of Hospitality and Tourism; America's Choice School Design Signature Program
Future program(s): Academy of Health and Biosciences; Academy of Graphic Arts, Media and Communications
|-
|  style="background:#fff;" colspan="8"|Notes & comments: Bladensburg received a state-of-the-art replacement facility in August 2004.
|-
|  rowspan="2"|Bowie High School (included with Bowie High School Annex)
|  align="center"|Link
|  align="center"|Bowie
|  align="center"|1965
|  align="center"|10–12
|  align="right"|2,442 students
|  align="right"|280,306
|  align="center"|7:45a – 2:25p
|  Current program(s): SUMMIT Scholar Signature Program
Future program(s): Academy of Information Technology; Performing Arts Academy; Academy of Environmental Sciences
|-
|  style="background:#fff;" colspan="8"|Notes & comments: Bowie High School has two physical campuses. 10th-12th grade attend classes at the main campus and 9th graders attend classes at the Belair Annex (a former middle school) a half mile away. Bowie was ranked #1,173 on Newsweeks 2010 list of Top 1500 Public High Schools in America. The SUMMIT Scholar Program at Bowie is a four-year course of study through which a select group of students (60-65 students per grade level) follow a comprehensive curriculum combining accelerated honors level and rigorous Advanced Placement course work. The program combines honors, SUMMIT, and Advanced Placement courses, yet remains an integral part of the high school community at Bowie; SUMMIT scholars do not comprise a school within a school.
|-
|  rowspan="2"|Bowie High School Annex (included with Bowie High School)
|  align="center"|Link
|  align="center"|Bowie
|  align="center"|1963
|  align="center"|9
|  align="right"|N/A
|  align="right"|102,351
|  align="center"|7:45a – 2:25p
|  Current program(s): SUMMIT Scholar Signature Program
Future program(s): Academy of Information Technology; Performing Arts Academy; Academy of Environmental Sciences
|-
|  style="background:#fff;" colspan="8"|Notes & comments: Bowie High School has two physical campuses. 10th-12th grade attend classes at the main campus and 9th graders attend classes at the Belair Annex (a former middle school) a half mile away. Bowie was ranked #1,173 on Newsweeks 2010 list of Top 1500 Public High Schools in America. The SUMMIT Scholar Program at Bowie is a four-year course of study through which a select group of students (60-65 students per grade level) follows a comprehensive curriculum combining accelerated honors level and rigorous Advanced Placement course work. The program combines honors, SUMMIT, and Advanced Placement courses yet remains an integral part of the high school community at Bowie; SUMMIT scholars do not comprise a school within a school.
|-
|  rowspan="2"|Central High School
|  align="center"|Link
|  align="center"|Walker Mill
|  align="center"|1961
|  align="center"|9–12
|  align="right"|1,004 students
|  align="right"|168,366
|  align="center"|7:45a – 2:25p
|  Current program(s): French Immersion Magnet Program; International Baccalaureate (IB) Magnet Program; Law, Education and Public Service Academy; AVID Signature Program; America's Choice School Design Signature Program
Future program(s): Global Studies Academy; Academy of Graphic Arts, Media and Communications
|-
|  style="background:#fff;" colspan="8"|Notes & comments: Central was ranked #1,429 on Newsweeks Top 1500 Public High Schools in America for 2010. It is an IB World School. Programs they have include Architecture and Design, Global Studies, Graphic Arts, Media and Communications  
 Health and Biosciences
 Consumer Services, Hospitality and Tourism
 Law, Education and Public Service
 Cosmetology(CAPS)
 Culinary(CAPS)
 Electrical(CAPS)
 Carpentry(CAPS)
 French Immersion
 Nursing(CAPS)
|-
|  rowspan="2"|Crossland High School
|  align="center"|Link
|  align="center"|Camp Springs
|  align="center"|1963
|  align="center"|9–12
|  align="right"|1,081 students
|  align="right"|313,276
|  align="center"|7:45a – 2:25p
|  Current program(s): Technical Academy Magnet Program; International Baccalaureate (IB) Program (non-magnet); Global Studies Academy; America's Choice School Design Signature Program; Crossland Evening High School
Future program(s): Academy of Architecture and Design; Academy of Transportation Technologies; Performing Arts Academy
|-
|  style="background:#fff;" colspan="8"|Notes & comments: Crossland was named an IB World School in 2009.
|-
|  rowspan="2"|Frederick Douglass High School
|  align="center"|Link
|  align="center"|Upper Marlboro
|  align="center"|1965
|  align="center"|9–12
|  align="right"|940 students
|  align="right"|184,417
|  align="center"|7:45a – 2:25p
|  Current program(s): International Baccalaureate (IB) Middle Years Programme; America's Choice School Design Signature Program
Future program(s): Academy of Global Studies; Academy of Business and Finance; Academy of Information Technology
|-
|  style="background:#fff;" colspan="8"|Notes & comments: Frederick Douglass is an IB World School.
|-
|  rowspan="2"|DuVal High School
|  align="center"|Link
|  align="center"|Lanham
|  align="center"|1960
|  align="center"|9–12
|  align="right"|1,697 students
|  align="right"|281,281
|  align="center"|8:30a – 3:10p
|  Current program(s): Aerospace Engineering and Aviation Technology Program; Project Lead The Way Pre-Engineering Academy; America's Choice School Design Signature Program;  Academy of Consumer Services, Hospitality & Tourism; Academy of  Humanities, Leadership & Public Service; Academy of Engineering and Science; Academy of Graphic Arts, Media and Communications
Future program(s): Academy of Transportation Technologies
|-
|  style="background:#fff;" colspan="8"|Notes & comments: DuVal received a state-of-the-art, $13.4 million USD, 65,995 sq. ft., 600-student classroom addition in 2007. This added a music wing and two-story academic wing. Starting in 2014, DuVal housed a new specialized Aerospace Engineering and Aviation Technology Program. Admission is based on competitive examination only, and prospective students take the same specialized examination currently used for entrance into the Science and Technology Center. DuVal is currently constructing a new Aerospace building that will be placed next to the Cafeteria.
|-
|  rowspan="2"|Fairmont Heights High School
|  align="center"|Link
|  align="center"|Chapel Oaks
|  align="center"|1950
|  align="center"|9–12
|  align="right"|788 students
|  align="right"|174,128
|  align="center"|8:30a – 3:10p
|  Current program(s): Biotechnology Magnet Program; National Academy of Finance; Information Technology; America's Choice School Design Signature Program
Future program(s): Academy of Environmental Studies; Performing Arts Academy
|-
|  style="background:#fff;" colspan="8"|Notes & comments: Fairmont Heights is one of three PGCPS high schools which house a special Health and Wellness Center', an on-site medical facility operated under the auspices of the county's Health Department.
|-
|  rowspan="2"|Charles Herbert Flowers High School
|  align="center"|Link
|  align="center"|Springdale
|  align="center"|2001
|  align="center"|9–12
|  align="right"|2,032 students
|  align="right"|332,500
|  align="center" |7:45a – 2:25p
|  Current program(s): Science and Technology Center Magnet Program; National Academy of Finance; Project Lead The Way Pre-Engineering Academy; ProStart: Hospitality and Restaurant Management Program
Future program(s): Academy of Engineering and Science; Academy of Information Technology
|-
|  style="background:#fff;" colspan="8"|Notes & comments: Flowers was ranked #1,445 on Newsweeks Top 1500 Public High Schools in America, for 2009.
|-
|  rowspan="2"|Friendly High School
|  align="center"|Link 
|  align="center"|Friendly
|  align="center"|1970
|  align="center"|9–12
|  align="right"|979 students
|  align="right"|236,861
|  align="center"|7:45a – 2:25p
|  Current program(s): Academy of Health and Biosciences; America's Choice School Design Signature Program
Future program(s): Academy of Engineering and Science; Academy of Information Technology
|-
|  style="background:#fff;" colspan="8"|Notes & comments:
|-
|  rowspan="2"|Gwynn Park High School
|  align="center"|Link
|  align="center"|Brandywine
|  align="center"|1956
|  align="center"|9–12
|  align="right"|1,064 students
|  align="right"|194,845
|  align="center"|7:45a – 2:25p
|  Current program(s): Technical Academy Magnet Program; America's Choice School Design Signature Program; Academy of Consumer Services, Hospitality and Tourism; Academy of Environmental Studies; Academy of Information Technology; 
Future program(s): Academy of Transportation Technologies
|-
|  style="background:#fff;" colspan="8"|Notes & comments: 
|-
|  rowspan="2"|High Point High School
|  align="center"|Link
|  align="center"|Beltsville
|  align="center"|1954
|  align="center"|9–12
|  align="right"|2,426 students
|  align="right"|318,376
|  align="center"|8:45a – 3:25p
|  Current program(s): AVID Signature Program; Academy of Engineering and Science
Future program(s): Academy of Environmental Studies; Academy of Military Science
|-
|  style="background:#fff;" colspan="8"|Notes & comments: High Point received the Siemens Award for Advanced Placement in 2004. High Point was ranked #1,361 on Newsweeks Top 1500 Public High Schools in America, for 2010. U.S. News & World Report named High Point a Silver Medal School in 2010.
|-
|  rowspan="2"|Largo High School
|  align="center"|Link
|  align="center"|Largo
|  align="center"|1970
|  align="center"|9–12
|  align="right"|1,026 students
|  align="right"|243,581
| align="center" |7:45a – 2:25p
|  Current program(s): Biotechnology Magnet Program; AVID Signature Program; America's Choice School Design Signature Program; Largo Evening High School
Future program(s): Academy of Health and Biosciences; Academy of Hospitality and Tourism
|-
|  style="background:#fff;" colspan="8"|Notes & comments:
|-
|  rowspan="2"|Laurel High School
|  align="center"|Link
|  align="center"|Laurel
|  align="center"|1961
|  align="center"|9–12
|  align="right"|1,814 students
|  align="right"|371,531
|  align="center"|7:45a – 2:25p
|  Current program(s): Technical Academy Magnet Program; International Baccalaureate (IB) Program (Non-Magnet); Academy of Global Studies; America's Choice School Design Signature Program
Future program(s): Academy of Transportation Technologies; Academy of Information Technology; Academy of Architecture and Design
|-
|  style="background:#fff;" colspan="8"|Notes & comments: Laurel completed a 600-student classroom addition and a new auditorium in the spring of 2010. Laurel was ranked #1,343 on Newsweeks Top 1500 Public High Schools in America, for 2010. It is an IB World School.
|-
|  rowspan="2"|Northwestern High School
|  align="center"|Link
|  align="center"|Hyattsville
|  align="center"|1951
|  align="center"|9–12
|  align="right"|2,262 students
|  align="right"|386,000
|  align="center"|Comprehensive9:30a – 4:10p
CVPA Magnet8:15a – 4:10p
|  Current program(s): The Jim Henson Center for the Visual and Performing Arts Program; America's Choice School Design Signature Program; School of Business Management and Finance (National Academy of Finance, Academy of Business Management); School of Human Resource Services (The International Studies Academy, NJROTC Academy of Military Science); School of Manufacturing, Engineering and Technology (Project Lead The Way Pre-Engineering Academy); Colours Performing Arts Program; Northwestern Evening High School; Northwestern Adult Evening High School; Northwestern Saturday Academy
Future program(s): Academy of Law, Education and Public Service; Performing Arts Academy
|-
|  style="background:#fff;" colspan="8"|Notes & comments: Northwestern received a state-of-the-art, $45 million replacement facility, which opened in August 2000. At 386,000sq. ft., it was then the largest high school in the state of Maryland in terms of total square footage. It was surpass in physical size by the new Dr. Henry Wise, Jr. HS (also in Prince George's County), in 2006. Northwestern is the second largest high school in Maryland. U.S. News & World Report named Northwestern a Silver Medal School in 2010. Northwestern became the county's second location for the Center for the Visual and Performing Arts program in the fall of 2013. The program is in-boundary only, and draws students from the Hyattsville Middle School for the Creative and Performing Arts. Entrance into the program is through competitive audition only. Northwestern is one of three PGCPS high schools which house a special Health and Wellness Center, an on-site medical facility operated under the auspices of the county's Health Department.
|-
|  rowspan="2"|Oxon Hill High School
|  align="center"|Link
|  align="center"|Oxon Hill
| align="center" |1948
|  align="center"|9–12
| align="right" |1,456 students
|  align="right"|243,048
|  align="center"|9:30a – 4:10p
|  Current program(s): Science and Technology Center Magnet Program; AVID Signature Program; America's Choice School Design Signature Program; Academy of Business and Finance (Academy of Accounting and Finance, Academy of Business Administrative Services, Academy of Business Management); Academy of Engineering; Academy of Graphic Arts and Media; Academy of Consumer Sciences, Hospitality and Tourism (Academy of Hospitality and Restaurant Management); Academy of Military SciencesFuture program(s): Academy of Health and Biosciences
|-
|  style="background:#fff;" colspan="8"|Notes & comments: Oxon Hill was ranked #957 on Newsweeks Top 1500 Public High Schools in America, for 2010. In August 2013, Oxon Hill relocated into a brand new LEED-certified building, that replaced the decades-old former facility. The new school was constructed adjacent to the former building. Oxon Hill is one of three PGCPS high schools which house a special Health and Wellness Center, an on-site medical facility operated under the auspices of the county's Health Department.
|-
|  rowspan="2"|Parkdale High School
|  align="center"|Link
|  align="center"|Riverdale
|  align="center"|1968
|  align="center"|9–12
|  align="right"|2,148 students
|  align="right"|265,201
|  align="center"|7:45a – 2:25p
|  Current program(s): International Baccalaureate (IB) Magnet Program; America's Choice School Design Signature Program; Academy of Global Studies; Capital One Student Banking ProgramFuture program(s): Academy of Architecture and Design; Academy of Law, Education and Public Service; Academy of Military Science
|-
|  style="background:#fff;" colspan="8"|Notes & comments: Parkdale received a state-of-the-art, 400-seat classroom addition in November 2007. Parkdale was ranked #1,481 on Newsweeks Top 1500 Public High Schools in America, for 2010. Parkdale is an IB World School.
|-
|  rowspan="2"|Potomac High School
|  align="center"|Link
|  align="center"|Oxon Hill
|  align="center"|1965
|  align="center"|9–12
|  align="right"|1,145 students
|  align="right"|218,083
|  align="center"|7:45a – 2:25p
|  Current program(s): America's Choice School Design Signature Program; National Academy of Finance; School of Arts, Media and Communications (Academy of the Arts-Dance, Academy of the Arts-Music, Academy of the Arts-Visual); School of Business Management and Finance (Academy of Finance, Academy of Business Management); School of Consumer Services, Hospitality and Tourism (Academy of Hospitality and Restaurant Management); School of Human Resource Services (Academy of Homeland Security and Military Science, Academy of Law, Education and Public Service, Teacher Academy of Maryland); School of Manufacturing, Engineering and Technology (Project Lead the Way Pre-Engineering Academy, Information Technology)Future program(s): Academy of Environmental Studies; Academy of Graphic Arts, Media and Communications
|-
|  style="background:#fff;" colspan="8"|Notes & comments: Potomac received a state-of-the-art, 600-seat classroom addition in January 2008.
|-
|  rowspan="2"|Eleanor Roosevelt High School
|  align="center"|Link
|  align="center"|Greenbelt
|  align="center"|1974
|  align="center"|9–12
|  align="right"|2,504 students
|  align="right"|327,458
|  align="center"|8:30a – 3:10p
|  Current program(s): Science and Technology Center Magnet Program; Capstone Program; Gilder-Lehrman American History Program; National Academy of Finance; Quality Education in Science and Technology (QUEST) Program/Academy of Information Technology (AOIT)
|-
|  style="background:#fff;" colspan="8"|Notes & comments: Eleanor Roosevelt has been twice recognized as a National Blue Ribbon School of Excellence, in 1991 and 1998, as well as a Maryland Blue Ribbon School of Excellence in 1991 and 1998. It was named a New American High School in 1999, and it received the Siemens Award for Advanced Placement in 2002. Roosevelt was named a National School of Character in 2002. It was ranked #409 on Newsweeks 2010 list of "Top 1500 Public High Schools in America. U.S. News & World Report named Roosevelt a Silver Medal School in 2008.
|-
|  rowspan="2"|Suitland High School (included with Suitland High School CVPA Annex)
|  align="center"|Link
|  align="center"|Suitland
|  align="center"|1951
|  align="center"|9–12
|  align="right"|1,806 students
|  align="right"|324,046
|  align="center"|Comprehensive8:40a – 3:25pCVPA Magnet8:30a – 4:40p
|  Current program(s): Center for the Visual and Performing Arts Magnet Program; International Baccalaureate (IB) Magnet Program; Technical Academy Magnet Program (the Jesse J. Warr Vocational Center); America's Choice School Design Signature Program; Navy Junior ROTC (NJROTC) Academy; School of Business and Finance (National Academy of Finance; Academy of Homeland Security and Military Science)Future program(s): Academy of Architecture and Design; Academy of Transportation Technologies
|-
|  style="background:#fff;" colspan="8"|Notes & comments: Suitland High School has two physical campuses: the main campus and the "annex" (a former elementary school) located directly behind the main campus, which houses the majority of the school's Center for the Visual and Performing Arts magnet program. Suitland was named a 1989 National Blue Ribbon School of Excellence and a 1989 Maryland Blue Ribbon School. It is an IB World School.
|-
|  rowspan="2"|Suitland High School CVPA Annex (included with Suitland High School)
|  align="center"|Link
|  align="center"|Suitland
|  align="center"|1963
|  align="center"|9-12
|  align="right"|N/A
|  align="right"|70,933
|  align="center"|Comprehensive8:30a – 3:10pCVPA Magnet8:30a – 4:40p
|  Current program(s): Center for the Visual and Performing Arts Magnet Program; International Baccalaureate (IB) Magnet Program; Technical Academy Magnet Program (the Jesse J. Warr Vocational Center); America's Choice School Design Signature Program; Navy Junior ROTC (NJROTC) Academy; School of Business and Finance (National Academy of Finance; Academy of Homeland Security and Military Science)Future program(s): Academy of Architecture and Design; Academy of Transportation Technologies
|-
|  style="background:#fff;" colspan="8"|Notes & comments: Suitland High School has two physical campuses: the main campus and the "annex" (a former elementary school) located directly behind the main campus, which houses the majority of the school's Center for the Visual and Performing Arts magnet program. It was named a 1989 National Blue Ribbon School of Excellence.
|-
|  rowspan="2"|Dr. Henry A. Wise, Jr. High School
|  align="center"|Link
|  align="center"|Upper Marlboro
|  align="center"|2006
|  align="center"|9–12
|  align="right"|2,255 students
|  align="right"|434,600
|  align="center"|9:00a – 3:40p
|  Current program(s): Technical Academy Magnet Program; Academy of Health and Biosciences; Academy of Computer NetworkingFuture program(s): Performing Arts Academy
|-
|  style="background:#fff;" colspan="8"|Notes & comments: At 434,600 sq. ft. and with a capacity of 2,600 students, Wise is the largest high school in the state of Maryland when measured by total square footage. It was completed in August 2006 and features a 5,000-seat professional gymnasium, the largest of any school in the Washington metropolitan area.
|}

 Middle schools 

Intermediate schools are referred to as "middle schools" in the PGCPS system, and operate as grades 6–8 middle schools. Grades 7–9 junior high school were phased out in the mid-1980s. Recent efforts have been made to convert most middle schools to the more popular grades 6–8 model. Issues in the past such as over-enrollment, lack of classroom space, and funding, had made it hard to convert all middle schools to a grades 6–8 configuration, but with increased funding and the addition of new middle schools, the transition is slowly being made, to be completed by the beginning of SY2024-2025.

Most middle schools in Prince George's County operate with a "comprehensive" model, as their base. Most students are assigned to a middle school based on an "attendance area." Most magnet programs operate as a "School-Within-A-School" model, where the magnet serves as an alternative program, in addition to the main comprehensive program, and students from outside the regular attendance area of the middle school are enrolled and accepted into the magnet, either through "continuity" (automatic continuation from an elementary school magnet program to the middle school level equivalent) or more commonly, through a magnet lottery, where students apply for a magnet program and are granted acceptance through a random drawing. Almost all middle schools have a whole-school "Signature Program" that includes a specialized program of instruction which is the foundation of the school's comprehensive program.

All middle schools in the PGCPS operate on a staggered school day schedule, where some middle schools start as early as 7:30 am and the end as early as 2:50 pm, and other middle schools start as late as 9:00 am and end as late as 4:20 pm. All middle schools operate on a modified block scheduling system, where some classes meet for as long as 70-minutes, daily. For the 2012-13 school year and beyond, an additional 40-minutes of instruction time has been added to the school day for all middle schools and their students, within the school district.

In a cooperative effort of the county government, Board of Education, and the Maryland-National Capital Park & Planning Commission (M-NCPPC) some M-NCPPC community centers are physically connected to middle schools, throughout the district. The unique community park/school centers features shared use areas which include a gymnasium, multi-purpose room, exercise/fitness room, dance room, arts and crafts room, computer lab, offices; storage areas, patio area, and restrooms. There are tennis courts and unlighted fields located on-site at select centers.

Dedicated magnet schools
Dedicated magnet schools are offered in the PGCPS system at the PreK-8th grade, elementary and middle school level only. As of 2012-13, Glenarden Woods and Heather Hills are the only full elementary-level dedicated magnet schools in the system. Dedicated magnet schools are "whole school" programs and differ from traditional comprehensive schools, as (1) all students at the school are enrolled and receive instruction in the magnet program and (2) traditional attendance areas for assigning students to a school are replaced by much larger geographical attendance zones, usually split between north county (areas north of Central Avenue) and south county (areas south of Central Avenue). Whole school, dedicated magnet programs are offered through the Creative and Performing Arts, French Immersion, Montessori, and Talented & Gifted Center magnet programs. Students receive specialized instruction that varies from the typical comprehensive program, offered at most other schools. Students are selected for the magnet programs through a magnet lottery for the French Immersion and Montessori programs and also for the Creative and Performing Arts program at the elementary school level. Acceptance into the Creative and Performing Arts program is through audition only at the middle school level. Acceptance into the TAG Centers at Glenarden Woods and Heather Hills Elementary Schools is through specialized TAG testing only.

 Combined elementary and middle schools 
Pre-kindergarten through grade 8 schools are essentially combined elementary and middle schools, facilitated in one building. Most of these schools are referred to as "academies" in the school district. The elementary school usually starts at pre-kindergarten and ends at grade 5 and the middle school starts at grade 6 and ends at grade 8. These schools usually offer a slightly enhanced standard of learning and studies have suggested that students have benefited from being in one continuous facility from kindergarten through 8th grade, without having the disruption having to attend a brand new school, for the middle school years. Cora L. Rice Elementary School and G. James Gholson Middle School are not true academies. Both schools are housed in one facility but they operate as two completely separate schools for all intents and purposes.

 Elementary schools 

Elementary schools in Prince George's County operate in several configurations, ranging from Pre-K (Head Start) through grade 6. Most elementary schools operate under a kindergarten through grade 6 configuration, and lack a pre-kindergarten/Head Start program. More recently, with boundary realignments to ease overcrowding and with the opening of newer and larger schools and increased funding, several schools have changed to a PreK-6th grade configuration while others have added a Pre-kindergarten, but dropped the sixth grade, to change to a Pre-K through grade 5 school. The sixth grades from those schools were added to the elementary schools' feeder middle schools.

In a cooperative effort of the county government, Board of Education, and the Maryland National Capital Park & Planning Commission (M-NCPPC), several M-NCPPC community centers are physically connected to elementary schools, throughout the district. The unique community park/school centers features shared use areas which include a gymnasium, multi-purpose room, exercise/fitness room, dance room, arts and crafts room, computer lab, offices, storage areas, patio area, and restrooms. Tennis courts and unlighted fields are located on-site at select centers.

Former schools

 High schools
 Forestville High School (Forestville Military Academy)
 Frederick Sasscer Junior-Senior High School (Upper Marlboro) - Established in 1948 to relieve crowding at the former Marlboro High School. The school was named after the first Prince George's County Superintendent of Schools,  Frederick Sasscer Jr. (1902–1914). The last graduating class was in 1971. The school became a junior high school only beginning in the 1971-72 school year and, in the late 1970s, school operations ceased and the facility was transformed into the Prince George's County Board of Education's Sasscer Administration Building.
 Lakeland High School (College Park) - A segregated school for black children, operated from 1928, to 1950, when it was replaced by Fairmont Heights High School near Fairmount Heights.
 Marlboro High School (Upper Marlboro, Maryland) - Marlboro High School began as Upper Marlboro Academy in c. 1860. The building was replaced in 1934, and the school became Marlboro High School. It operated until 1948 when junior and high school operations were moved to the, at the time, new Frederick Sasscer High School to address overcrowding. Primary school operations continued at the former high school until 1974.
 Middle schools
 Eugene Borroughs Middle School (Accokeek) - Merged into Accokeek Academy in 2009.
 Frederick Sasscer Junior High School (Upper Marlboro) - Began operations in the 1971-72 school year as a junior high school only after students in grades 10 through 12 were moved to other schools, operating until the late 1970s when the facility was transformed into the Prince George's County Board of Education's Sasscer Administration Building.
 G. Gardner Shugart Middle School (Hillcrest Heights CDP)"2010 CENSUS - CENSUS BLOCK MAP: Hillcrest Heights CDP, MD ." U.S. Census Bureau. Retrieved on August 29, 2018. - Shugart was scheduled to close in 2009. According to a Washington Post article written by Nelson Hernandez, Shugart, in which 35% of its students passed a State of Maryland mathematics proficiency test and which underwent a restructuring required by State of Maryland authorities, "is among the schools with long-standing academic problems".

 Elementary schools
 Berkshire Elementary School (Suitland CDP)"2010 CENSUS - CENSUS BLOCK MAP (INDEX): Suitland CDP, MD ." U.S. Census Bureau. Retrieved on August 29, 2018. Pages: 1  and 2 . - It could hold up to 550 students. Berkshire Elementary closed in 2009. Its final enrollment was 281.
 John Carroll Elementary School (current Summerfield CDP)Home. John Carroll Elementary School. Retrieved on September 8, 2018. "1400 Nalley Terrace Landover, MD  20785" - Scheduled to close in 2009.
 Mullikin Elementary (Mitchellville, Maryland) Operated from at least the 1940s until the mid-1960s when it burned and was razed. Today, the land serves as a Prince George's County school bus lot. 
 Thomas Claggett Elementary School (Walker Mill CDP)"2010 CENSUS - CENSUS BLOCK MAP (INDEX): Walker Mill CDP, MD ." U.S. Census Bureau. Retrieved on August 31, 2018. Pages: 1 , 2, and 3 . - Its official capacity was 464. In 2005 it had 236 students, filling 49% of the official capacity; this was the lowest percentage of any PGCPS school. At one point the capacity percentage was 38%. In 2010 it had 290 students, but after that year the student count declined: it had 216, and later 223 in the 2013-2014 school year, and the projected 2014-2015 enrollment was 187. In addition, in state tests circa 2014, about 56% of the students were proficient in reading while 36.7% were proficient in mathematics. In May 2014 PGCPS applied for a grant from the state of Maryland that would permit it to close Claggett.
 College Park Elementary School (College Park) - For a period Friends Community School occupied the building, but it moved out in 2007. The nascent College Park Academy attempted to lease the previous College Park elementary building, but there was community opposition. The grade 6-12 charter school currently is located in Riverdale Park.
 Henry G. Ferguson Elementary School (Accokeek) - Merged into Accokeek Academy in 2009.
 Matthew Henson Elementary School (Landover CDP)Home page. Matthew Henson Elementary School. May 16, 2001. Retrieved on September 7, 2018. "Matthew Henson Elementary/Montessori School 7910 Scott Road Landover, Maryland 20785" - Scheduled to close in 2009. In 2012 EXCEL Academy agreed to open a charter school in the former Henson space, and it moved from its previous campus in Riverdale.
 John Edgar Howard Elementary School (Coral Hills CDP)Home. John Edgar Howard Elementary School. February 19, 1999. Retrieved on September 7, 2018. "John Edgar Howard Elmentary School 4400 Shell Street Capitol Heights, MD 20743" - Scheduled to close in 2009. The facility is now used as the John E. Howard Community Center, operated by the Prince George's County Department of Parks and Recreation.
 Lakeland Elementary School (College Park) - A segregated school for black children, it opened in 1925.
 Middleton Valley Elementary School (Camp Springs CDP)"Middleton Valley Elementary." Prince George's County Public Schools. February 4, 2003. Retrieved on September 8, 2018. "Address: 4815 Dalton Street Temple Hills, MD 20748" - It was scheduled to close on June 18, 2009.
 Morningside Elementary School (Morningside)"About Our School ." Morningside Elemenatary School. Retrieved on August 29, 2018. "6900 Ames Street, Suitland, Maryland 20746" and "Situated in the town of Morningside,[...]" - It opened in 1956. The school, which had a capacity of 300 students, closed in 2009. At the end of its life it was one of the few PGCPS schools in which significant numbers of students traveled to school on foot. A report made by a non-PGCPS authority generated around 2009 stated that the condition of Morningside Elementary's building was one of the poorest of any school in Prince George's County. By 2011 Imagine Schools was scheduled to open a campus in the former Morningside Elementary, now known as Imagine Foundations at Morningside Public Charter School, which serves grades PK-8.
 Owens Road Elementary School (Glassmanor CDP)Home. Owens Road Elementary School. February 7, 2005. Retrieved on September 8, 2018. "Owens Road Elementary School 1616 Owens Road Oxon Hill, MD 20745" - It was scheduled to close on June 18, 2009.
 Skyline Elementary School (Camp Springs)Home. Skyline Elementary School. Retrieved on April 29, 2018. "6311 Randolph Road Suitland, MD 20744" - It closed in 2016. Post-closure its students were to be sent to Beanes Elementary. Until its closing it had a program for autistic students.

Accolades and achievements
Newsweeks America's Best High Schools
In June 2010, seven PGCPS high school were listed in Newsweeks annual list of the top 1600 high schools in the nation. This was up from five county high schools which made the list from the previous year. The 2010 list included Eleanor Roosevelt High School in Greenbelt (#409), Oxon Hill High School in Oxon Hill (#957), Bowie High School in Bowie (#1,173), Laurel High School in Laurel (#1,343), High Point High School in Beltsville (#1,361), Central High School in Capitol Heights (#1,429), and Parkdale High School in Riverdale (#1,481).

The schools are ranked on the number of Advanced Placement, International Baccalaureate and/or Cambridge tests taken by all students in a school in 2009, divided by the number of graduating seniors, called the "Challenge Index".  The schools represent the top six percent of all public high schools in America. In June 2009, five PGCPS high schools were named in the best high schools list. It included Bowie High School in Bowie, Charles Herbert Flowers High School in Springdale, High Point High School in Beltsville, Oxon Hill High School in Oxon Hill, and Eleanor Roosevelt High School in Greenbelt. Eleanor Roosevelt ranked the highest out of county schools at 372nd on the nationwide list, Oxon Hill ranked 918th, High Point ranked 961st, Bowie ranked 1,370th, and Charles Herbert Flowers ranked 1,445th.

U.S. News & World Reports Best High Schools
Since 2007, U.S. News & World Report has ranked high schools in PGCPS among the Best High Schools in America. High Point High School, Northwestern High School, and Eleanor Roosevelt High School have been recognized as Silver Medal Schools.

State and national Blue Ribbon Schools
PGCPS has 16 state Blue Ribbon Schools, 13 of which are USDE National Blue Ribbon Schools of Excellence.

National Blue Ribbon Schools of Excellence
Beacon Heights Elementary School, Riverdale, 2003–04
Columbia Park Elementary School, Landover, 1987–88
Fort Foote Elementary School, Fort Washington, 2000–01
Glenarden Woods Elementary School, Glenarden, 2005–06
Greenbelt Center Elementary School, Greenbelt, 1991–92
Heather Hills Elementary School, Bowie, 1989–90
Templeton Elementary School, Riverdale, 1998–99
Whitehall Elementary School, Bowie, 2011–12
Kenmoor Middle School, Landover, 1988–89
Dora Kennedy French Immersion, Greenbelt, 2013–14
Kettering Middle School, Upper Marlboro, 1992–93
Martin Luther King, Jr. Middle School, Beltsville, 1992–93
Eleanor Roosevelt High School, Greenbelt, 1990-91 & 1997-98
Suitland High School, Forestville, 1988–89

Maryland Blue Ribbon Schools
Beacon Heights Elementary School, Riverdale, 2003–04
Bond Mill Elementary School, Laurel (year N/A)
Columbia Park Elementary School, Landover, 1987–88
Fort Foote Elementary School, Fort Washington, 2000–01
Glenarden Woods Elementary School, Glenarden, 2005–06
Greenbelt Center Elementary School, Greenbelt, 1991–92
Heather Hills Elementary School, Bowie, 1989-90 & 2006-07
Rockledge Elementary School, Bowie, 1997–98
Whitehall Elementary School, Bowie, 2011–12
Templeton Elementary School, Riverdale, 1998–99
Kenmoor Middle School, Landover, 1988–89
Dora Kennedy French Immersion, Greenbelt, 2013–14
Kettering Middle School, Upper Marlboro, 1992–93
Martin Luther King, Jr. Middle School, Beltsville, 1992–93
Eleanor Roosevelt High School, Greenbelt, 1990-91 & 1997-98
Suitland High School, Forestville, 1988–89

Magnet programs and centers
Magnet programs were first implemented in PGCPS in 1985, to fulfill a court-ordered desegregation mandate. Up until as late as the late 80s, Prince George's County had been predominantly white in terms of racial demographics. In order to desegregate mostly all-White schools in the school system, PGCPS created several magnet programs that eventually were instituted in over fifty schools, spread throughout the county.

By the late 1990s, the population demographics of the county had shifted towards a mostly African American majority. Magnet programs (as they were set up) were costing PGCPS approximately $14 million per year, to operate. The programs were costly and this was exacerbated by the fact that the school system's operating budget was greater than the final budget the school system had traditionally been allotted, an issue that had plagued the school system for years. Since the county's population now primarily consisted of African Americans, and due to the expense of operating the Magnet Schools Program, courts began to investigate the justification of PGCPS's magnet program. In 2004, a court ruled to discontinue court-ordered busing which had existed in the county, for over 30 years, based primarily on the fact that desegregation was no longer an issue in the predominantly Black Prince George's County.

With the ending of the court-ordered busing, also came changes to the school system's Magnet Schools Program. The program had gained national attention, as it was one of the largest in the country. It served as a model for school systems across the nation. Dr. Iris T. Metts, the superintendent of schools at the time, formulated an ambitious plan to actually expand the magnet programs in PGCPS, as well as reassign magnet programs that weren't performing well at one location, to other schools. Due to long and highly publicized in-house issues between Metts and the Board of Education, Metts was replaced by Dr. Andre Hornsby at the end of her contract with PGCPS. When Hornsby arrived, he essentially reversed the decision that Metts had made, in regards to the future of the county's magnet programs, and he decided to instead eliminate most of the school system's magnet programs, most of which had been identified as under-performing for several years. Ten magnet programs were identified for elimination, which proved extremely controversial because some of the proposed eliminated programs were located at sites in which the program in question had been extremely successful, such as the Academic Center magnet program at Martin Luther King, Jr. Academic Center, which had been the highest performing middle school in the system for several years and also was a blue ribbon school.

Despite the opposition by parents, in 2006 the magnet programs in PGCPS underwent an overhaul, and most of the magnets were eliminated. A few programs that were determined to be "successful" were either expanded and replicated at other locations, or consolidated and relocated to a dedicated magnet school that would serve large geographic areas of the county.

Current magnet programs
ES = elementary school; MS = middle school; HS = high school

Aerospace Engineering and Aviation Technology Program (HS)
Biomedical (HS)
Biotechnology (HS)
Career and Technical Education (HS)
Centers for Visual and Performing Arts (HS)
Chinese Immersion (ES, MS)
Creative and Performing Arts (ES, MS)
French Immersion (ES, MS, HS)
International Baccalaureate (HS)
Montessori (ES, MS)
Science and Technology Center (HS)
Spanish Dual Language Program (ES)
Spanish Immersion (ES, MS)
Talented and Gifted Center (ES, MS)

Magnet program descriptions
Aerospace Engineering and Aviation Technology
The Aerospace Engineering and Aviation Technology program is a college and career preparatory program, offering areas of study in Aerospace Engineering and Aviation Technology. It is supported by partnerships with the College Park Aviation Museum, NASA, local colleges and universities, and private industry. This program is designed to prepare students for college and high-demand careers. Each student receives a laptop upon entry into the program, and is provided with transportation.

Admission to the program is based on the same criteria and examination used for the Science and Technology Center.Locations:DuVal High School

Biomedical
The Biomedical Program at Bladensburg High School is a high school curriculum that focuses on medical and health careers, such as physicians and research doctors. Students who have a strong interest in pursuing a career in health-related fields have an opportunity to engage in biomedical research, internships, and practicums, and to enroll in medical-related science courses and other advanced placement courses. The curriculum introduces students to a wide variety of medical careers through  field trips, speakers in the medical field, internships, accelerated courses, a wide variety of electives related to the biological and social sciences, and independent research.Locations: 
Bladensburg High School

Biotechnology
The Biotechnology Program offers a four-year, college-preparatory program of study in molecular biology, biochemistry and technical career training that includes scanning electron microscopy. Students have first-hand experience with the advanced technologies used in biotechnology research, academia, and industry.

Courses are taught in modern laboratory classrooms equipped with the latest biotechnology instrumentation. The facilities include gel electrophoresis, refrigerated centrifugation, scanning spectrophotometry, high pressure liquid chromatography, gas chromatography and access to scanning electron microscopy. Computers will support classroom instruction as well as student initiated research projects.

Students study biotechnology theory and technique in a cyclic fashion where concepts introduced in beginning courses will be emphasized in depth during upper level classes. Mini-research projects are conducted by science students to demonstrate their understanding of course content and laboratory procedures. Complementing the specific science offerings of the Biotechnology Program is a full selection of courses, including Advanced Placement level in English, social studies and mathematics.Eligibility Requirements: Students who express interest are eligible to apply. No pre-testing is required. Admission to the program is through a race-neutral random magnet lottery application process, on a space-available basis.Locations: 
Fairmont Heights High School
Largo High School

Career and Technical Education (CTE) Program
The Technical Academy is a program that provides students with technical skills and knowledge. Benefits to students include gaining a foundation for a college major in a technical field, having access to a technical career after high school if college is postponed, and having access to a part-time technical job to help with college expenses.Locations: 
Bladensburg High School
Crossland High School
Gwynn Park High School
Laurel High School
Suitland High School

Centers for the Visual and Performing Arts
The Centers for the Visual and Performing Arts (CVPA) has been in existence since 1986, originally at Suitland High School. The program was expanded to Northwestern High School in the fall of 2013. The CVPA is a rigorous four-year arts program that offers artistically talented high school students educational opportunities designed to prepare them artistically for college, professional study, or career options in the arts. Strong association with the arts in the Washington, DC-area offers distinct advantages. Students study with professional artists, dancers, actors, musicians, singers, directors/producers, and radio/television personalities. Students explore, and eventually major, in any one of the six principal concentrations: vocal music, instrumental music, dance, theatre, visual arts, and interactive media production. Suitland High School offers a 1000-seat auditorium and experimental theatre, a fully equipped dance studio, and a television and recording studio. Northwestern High School offers an 1100-seat auditorium, fully equipped dance studio, state-of-the-art music rooms, several music practice rooms, a piano lab, and a television and recording studio. Admission into the CVPA magnet program is through audition only.Locations: 
Northwestern High School
Suitland High School

Creative and Performing Arts
The Creative and Performing Arts Magnet Program is located at three sites. The programs at Thomas G. Pullen and Benjamin D. Foulois are open to students in Kindergarten through eighth grade; the program at Hyattsville Middle School is open to students in seventh and eighth grade (Hyattsville Middle School has a limited program boundary).

The Creative and Performing Arts Magnet Program is designed to develop the interest and talents of students in the arts, and feature an enhanced interdisciplinary academic program that encourages creative and artistic expression. Experiences and training are designed to challenge and develop skills of all students, as well as to provide exceptional opportunities for artistically talented students.

The curriculum provides in-depth experiences in each art discipline, plus related arts experiences and an infusion of the arts in the overall curriculum. The arts are provided as an integral part of a strong academic program.

The Creative Arts Schools follow the general curriculum guidelines that are used for all Prince George's County public elementary and middle schools. Basic instruction is provided in reading, mathematics, English, science, and social studies, as well as specialized instruction in the arts - art, drama, music, dance, physical education, creative writing, media production, literary arts, and related computer lab experiences.Locations: 
Thomas G. Pullen Creative and Performing Arts Academy
Hyattsville Middle School for the Creative and Performing Arts
The Benjamin D. Foulois Creative and Performing Arts Academy

French Immersion
The French Immersion Magnet Program is designed for kindergarten through twelfth grade. It is referred to as a "full immersion program" as all academic subjects are taught through French, in grades K-5. In grades 6-8, the students have two periods per day of French, one period for French Language Arts and one period of world studies in French. In high school, students have two courses in grades 9 and 10 with a focus on literature and the francophone world, which are part of the Pre-International Baccalaureate (IB) Program. At the elementary level, students are immerse totally in French by their bilingual teachers, as they learn math, science, social studies and language arts.

At the middle school level, students also study Italian. In addition, Algebra and Geometry are possible options in mathematics. The interdisciplinary approach for English, Art and World Studies includes special themes, seminars, field trips, and a strong focus on essay writing. International travel is an enrichment part of the French Immersion Program.

At the high school level, students may take one of the immersion courses and the continuation of the second foreign language started at the middle school level. Other options are IB preparation courses for English, history, science, and access to Chemistry and Calculus. Higher level IB or Advanced Placement (AP) courses, are available. There is an Exchange Program with a school in France and other exchanges are being explored for high school students. In addition to the immersion continuity, students may continue the study of their second foreign language which began in middle school — either Russian, Italian, Latin, or German.Locations: 
Maya Angelou French Immersion
Dora Kennedy French Immersion
Central High School

International Baccalaureate
The International Baccalaureate (IB) Diploma Magnet Program is an academically challenging and balanced course of study, that prepares students for success in college and life beyond. The mission of the program is to develop inquiring, knowledgeable, and caring young people who help to create a better, more peaceful world through intercultural understanding and respect.

The IB program offers many benefits to its participants, such as: higher university and college acceptance rates for IB graduates; increased scholarship and grant opportunities; a college-level academic program that transitions students to university and college standards; and teacher development using IB strategies.Locations: 
Central High School
Crossland High School
Laurel High School
Parkdale High School
Suitland High School

Montessori
Prince George's County Public Schools has implemented two facilities dedicated to the Montessori instructional program — the Robert Goddard Montessori School and the John Hanson Montessori School. As dedicated facilities, these schools do not have a neighborhood attendance area. Entry into the program is through the random lottery application process only.

The Montessori Primary Program for children ages 3 to 6 years old is based on the Montessori educational philosophy. Taught by Montessori accredited teachers, young children are guided in developing an inner discipline, strengthening their coordination, and extending their concentration span. These accomplishments result with their readily learning to read, write and grasp mathematics. The program consists of a half-day morning for preschoolers (ages 3 ). Children older than four must be enrolled in a certified Montessori program to be accepted into the program.

The Montessori Lower Elementary Program is designed for students ages 6 to 9 years old with prior Montessori experience. Rapid growth and learning is observed in classrooms filled with appropriate educational materials. The Montessori Upper Elementary Program continues for the next age grouping of students ages 9–12 with prior Montessori experience. Taught by Montessori accredited teachers, these elementary program students study an integrated curriculum that includes: mathematics, geometry, language, cultural studies, astronomy, biology, chemistry, geography, history, geology, philosophy, art, music and physical education.

The Montessori Middle School Program completes the Montessori studies for students progressing to the seventh and eighth grades. An interdisciplinary teaching team provides the Montessori Program for multidisciplinary learning to include English Language Arts, mathematics, science and social studies. At the high school level, the student can apply for entry to Biotechnology, Biomedical, Military Academy, Center for the Visual & Performing Arts and/or the Science & Technology Center.Locations:Robert Goddard Montessori School
John Hanson Montessori School
 Judith P. Hoyer Montessori School

Science and Technology Center
The Science and Technology Center (S/T) is a highly challenging four-year curriculum which provides college-level academic experiences in science, mathematics, and technology. The program is not a true magnet program, as students are admitted into the S/T program based on competitive examination only, as opposed to the standard magnet lottery process. Of twenty-eight possible credits, a student is required to obtain a minimum of thirteen credits in specific mathematics, pre-engineering technology, research and science courses. In grades nine and ten, the program consists of common experiences courses for all student. In grades eleven and twelve, each student must choose course work from at least one of four major study areas. Students are expected to be enrolled in a full schedule of classes during the entire four-year program. External experiences are possible and encouraged, but must be a direct extension or enrichment of the Science and Technology Program, and have the recommendation of the Science and Technology Center Coordinator prior to approval by the principal.

The program is offered at three centers — Eleanor Roosevelt High School in northern Prince George's County, Oxon Hill High School in southern Prince George's County, and Charles Herbert Flowers High School in central Prince George’s County. Students attend the center that serves their legal residence. Transportation is provided for all students. Each school is a four-year comprehensive high school, as well as a Science and Technology Center. Each school is an active member of the National Consortium for Specialized Secondary Schools of Mathematics, Science and Technology (NCSSSMST).

Admission into the Science and Technology Center is highly competitive and contingent upon three criterion, with all criterion weighed equally. The criterion are:

Grades from four quarters of 7th grade and the first quarter of 8th grade (or four quarters of 8th grade and first quarter of 9th grade) in math, science, English, and social studies
A standardized reading comprehension test
A standardized numerical test

All of these are factored into a final score. The number of students admitted into the S/T program vary from each school, but as an example, 225-250 students with the top scores are admitted to Roosevelt's Science and Technology Program. The next 60 students are placed on a waiting list. All interested 8th and 9th grade students who are residents of Prince George's County are eligible to apply for admission to the Science and Technology Center.

Locations
Charles Herbert Flowers High School
Oxon Hill High School
Eleanor Roosevelt High School

Spanish Dual Language Program
The Spanish Dual Language Program gives equal emphasis to English and non-English language speakers. Students learn Spanish and English through content based instruction in selected core subjects with a cross cultural understanding for both native and non-native speakers. Students read, write, listen and speak in both languages, becoming bilingual, biliterate and bicultural.

Locations
Cesar Chavez Elementary School

Spanish Immersion
Language Immersion is an educational approach in which students are taught the curriculum content through the medium of a second language, Spanish. Children learn their entire core subjects (reading, writing, mathematics, social studies, and science) in Spanish. Spanish speaking teachers immerse student completely in Spanish as they learn. In this way, immersion students not only learn the content, but also gain knowledge of the language in which it is taught.

Locations
Overlook Elementary School
Phyllis E. Williams Elementary School

Talented and Gifted Center (TAG)
Talented and Gifted Center (TAG) Magnet Schools provide a full-day intensive educational program appropriate for identified talented and gifted students, in grades 2-8. Each school offers a full-day of enriched and accelerated educational experiences in the four major content areas. Special offerings include elementary foreign language programs, computer laboratories, laboratory based science program, and fine arts programs.Locations:''' 
The Accokeek Academy
Capitol Heights Elementary School
Glenarden Woods Elementary School
Heather Hills Elementary School 
Highland Park Elementary School 
Longfields Elementary School 
Valley View Elementary School 
Greenbelt Middle School
Kenmoor Middle School
Walker Mill Middle School

See also

 List of Prince George's County Public Schools Middle Schools
 Prince George's County Public Schools Magnet Programs
 List of schools in Prince George's County, Maryland

References

External links 

Public Schools
School districts in Maryland
School districts established in 1899